The following article is a summary of the 2019–20 football season in France, which was the 86th season of competitive football in the country and ran from July 2019 to June 2020.

On 28 April 2020, Prime Minister Edouard Philippe announced all sporting events in France would be cancelled due to the COVID-19 pandemic.

National teams

France national football team

Friendlies

UEFA Euro 2020 qualifying

Group H

UEFA Euro 2020

France women's national football team

Friendly matches

2020 Tournoi de France

UEFA Women's Euro 2021 qualifying

Group G

UEFA competitions

UEFA Champions League

Group stage

Group A

Group G

Group H

Knockout phase

Round of 16 

|}

Quarter-finals

|}

Semi-finals

|}

Final

The "home" team (for administrative purposes) was determined by an additional draw held on 10 July 2020 (after the quarter-final and semi-final draws), at the UEFA headquarters in Nyon, Switzerland.

UEFA Europa League

Second qualifying round

|}

Third qualifying round

|}

Play-off round

|}

Group stage

Group E

Group I

UEFA Youth League

UEFA Champions League Path

Group A

Group G

Group H

Domestic Champions Path

First round

|}

Second round

|}

Play-offs

|}

Knockout phase

Round of 16

|}
Notes

Quarter-finals

|}

UEFA Women's Champions League

Knockout phase

Round of 32

|}

Round of 16

|}
Notes

Quarter-finals

|}

Semi-finals

|}

Final

League tables

Men

Ligue 1

Ligue 2

Championnat National

Championnat National 2

Women

Division 1 Féminine

Cup competitions

2019–20 Coupe de France

Final

2019–20 Coupe de la Ligue

Final

2019 Trophée des Champions

Notes

References

 
Seasons in French football
French
French